Víctor Chirinos (born 1 February 1941) is a former Venezuelan cyclist. He competed in the team time trial at the 1960 Summer Olympics.

References

External links
 

1941 births
Living people
Venezuelan male cyclists
Olympic cyclists of Venezuela
Cyclists at the 1960 Summer Olympics
Sportspeople from Caracas
20th-century Venezuelan people